Borneo Cultural Festival, abbreviated as BCF, is an annual festival of food, music, and dance that places a focus on cultural diversity of Borneo. The festival is held in Sibu, one of the major towns in the state of Sarawak, Malaysia, and was first organised in 2002. The festival regularly takes place in July, and is organised by the Sibu Municipal Council (SMC).

History
Since 2005, Borneo Cultural Festival (BCF) is held by Sibu Municipal Council (SMC) in July every year at Sibu Town Square, for a period of 10 days. It is a celebration of traditional music, dances, contests, beauty pageant, food stalls, fun fairs, and product exhibitions. There are 3 separate stages for Iban, Chinese, and Malay performances. It draws around 20,000 people every year. BCF was stopped briefly in 2011 before it was resumed in 2012. The festival also went on a two-year hiatus due to COVID-19 pandemic in 2020 and 2021.

Sibu has hosted the National Chinese Cultural Festival (全國華人文化節) twice: in 2001 (18th Festival) and 2009 (26th Festival) which lasted for 3 days. Among the activities organised during this festival were cultural village (a venue designated to showcase cultural heritages from various ethnicity), lantern riddles, cultural dances, Chinese songs, dragon dances, and Chinese calligraphy.

Event

From the past experiences, the venue of the main event will be held in Sibu town square so as the trade fair and the exhibition will be held on the second phase of the town square. Usually the main town square which is located next to Wisma Sanyan will be utilised by the stages and food stalls.

Dates of the Festival

References

External links
 
 Blogger Sixth Seal Coverage on Borneo Cultural Festival

Malaysian culture
Festivals established in 2002
Festivals in Malaysia
Events in Sarawak